Lucknow Super Division, or Lucknow District Football League, is the state-level top-division football league in the Indian state of Uttar Pradesh, started in 2015. In 2021 season it was organised grandly with 50 teams from Lucknow and other districts of Uttar Pradesh.

Structure 
50 teams, including 46 from Lucknow, four from other UP districts (Akbarpur, Haidergarh, Farrukhabad and Unnao), and one from Bhopal (MP), currently participate in the league.

Format 
The league is played in the group stage format where the teams play against each other at least once. All the matches are played at La Marts Football Ground in Lucknow. At the end of the season, final standings are determined, based on points obtained, goal difference and goals scored.

Current teams 
A total of 50 teams competed in the league in 2021 season, 9 in the final stage. Techtro Lucknow finished in first place, followed by Mansarovar, Golden Boys, Sunrise FC, KN FC, Real Mart, Aztech FC, Brayan FC and White Eagle.

2021 standings

Winners

References 

4
Football in Uttar Pradesh
2015 establishments in Uttar Pradesh
Sports leagues established in 2015